Strange Relations is an American indie rock band from Minneapolis, Minnesota.

History
Strange Relations began in 2011, shortly after the members moved to Minneapolis. Their debut album, -CENTRISM, was released in 2015. The band released an EP in 2016 titled Going Out. In 2017, Strange Relations released their sophomore album, Editorial You, on Tiny Engines.

Discography
Studio albums
 -CENTRISM (2015, self-released)
 Editorial You (2017, Tiny Engines)
EPs
 Going Out (2016, Tiny Engines)

Band members
 Casey Sowa (vocals, drums)
 Maro Helgeson (vocals, bass, synth)

Former members
 Andrew ‘Theramu’ Shaw (Guitar).
 Nate Hart-Andersen (Guitar).

References

Musical groups from Minnesota
2017 establishments in Minnesota
Indie rock musical groups from Minnesota
Tiny Engines artists